Sheikh Abdul Aziz (1929 – 8 April 2019) was a Bangladesh Awami League politician and the Minister of Information from April 1973 to September 1973.

Early life 
Aziz was born in 1929 in Teligati, Morelganj Upazila, Bagerhat District, East Bengal, British India. He completed his B.A. at Calcutta University and then his M.A. and law degree at Dhaka University.

Career 
Aziz was a founding member of Awami League and a close associate of President Sheikh Mujibur Rahman. He was a key leader of the Mujibnagar government during the Bangladesh Liberation war and worked as a liaison officer. He was the Minister of communication, agriculture, and post and telecommunication in the first cabinet of Bangladesh. He was imprisoned after the Assassination of Sheikh Mujibur Rahman.

Death 
Aziz died on 8 April 2019 in Dhaka, Bangladesh.

References

2019 deaths
Awami League politicians
Information ministers of Bangladesh
1929 births
People from Bagerhat District
Road Transport and Bridges ministers of Bangladesh
Bangladesh Krishak Sramik Awami League executive committee members
Bangladesh Krishak Sramik Awami League central committee members